Caged may refer to:

Film and TV
Caged (1950 film), an American film noir directed by John Cromwell
Caged (2010 film), a French horror film directed by Yann Gozlan
Caged (2011 film), a Dutch feature film directed by Stephan Brenninkmeijer
Caged (2020 film), a horror film directed by Aaron Fjellman
Caged (TV series), an MTV reality show about mixed martial artists in tiny Minden, Louisiana
"Caged" (CSI), the 7th episode of the second season of CSI: Crime Scene Investigation

Music
"Caged", a song by Charlene Soraia from Love Is the Law
"Caged", a song by Within Temptation from Mother Earth
 CAGED, a system for learning and playing guitar chords

See also
 Imprisonment, the restraint of a person's liberty